The Demon Boyz were an English hip hop group formed in London by Demon D, Mike J and DJ Devastate. They began rapping whilst in their early teens, performing at the Rebel MC’s Beat Freak gigs. Their big break came when they won a competition on Dave Pearce’s rap show, their prize being to perform live on stage with Derek B, Faze One and T La Rock at a gig at Camden Palace. Derek B – aka Derek Boland, quasi-A&R man for Music of Life records – was so impressed with the group that he put them in touch with the company’s founder, Simon Harris.

History
The group recorded the song "This is a Jam" for the inaugural release from the label's classic Hard as Hell series, Hard as Hell (Music of Life, 1987), and the group were quickly signed up on the back of this song's reception. As one of the first groups to rap in their natural accents – in an era when most British rappers were adopting fake American accents to emulate the hip hop music they were listening to – the Demon Boyz helped lay the foundations for the British hip hop scene.

Three singles and the debut album Recognition (Music of Life, 1989) followed, and the band were heavily featured on Music of Life's album Hustlers Convention, considered by many to be rap's first ever live album. The success of the former brought the group to the attention of Island Records’ subsidiary Mango Records. The group moved to the label, releasing the single "International Karate" (Mango, 1990) to high acclaim. However, Island closed their subsidiary soon afterwards, and the group found themselves without a record deal.

Going back to their roots, they joined the Tribal Bass label in 1991, and were also joined by a new DJ (DJ Def K). The record company was run by their old friend Rebel MC. The group released two more singles, "Dett" (featuring two mixes: Feeder Mix produced by DJ Pogo and Jungle Mix produced by Rebel MC) and "Glimity Glamity", a collaboration between Mike J, DJ Def K and Cutmaster Swift. The single remained number one in the hip-hop charts for more than four weeks. Their second album, Original Guidance (The Second Chapter) (Tribal Bass, 1992) soon followed. The album was well received within the scene, earning an even higher regard than their first release, but shortly afterwards the group split.

Mike J reappeared later on, under the name Million Dan, guesting on the single "High Grade" (Knowledge and Wisdom Records, 2001) by Knowledge and Wisdom. He then collaborated with The Freestylers on the singles "No Replica" (Against the Grain, 2003), "Boom Blast" and "Dogz and Sledgez", all of which appear on the album Raw as F**k. He continued to record; an album entitled Spektrum was released in May 2008 on his own label Million Dappa Records. Demon Boyz and Million Dan both have songs featuring on the Herbalizer's 2006 Fabriclive 26 mix CD, with "Glimmity Glammity" and "Dogz n Sledgez" respectively.

Discography 
Demon Boyz
 Recognition (Music of Life, 1989)
 Original Guidance (The Second Chapter) (Tribal Bass, 1992)

Compilation appearances
Hustlers Convention (1989)

Million Dan
 Spektrum (2008)

References

Bibliography

External links
The original UK Hip Hop History
Heroes of UK Hip Hop’s Demon Boyz page
Million Dan (Mike J)’s website
Interview with Million Dan (Mike J)
Million Dan interview at britishhiphop.co.uk, June 2008

English hip hop groups
Musical groups from London